Alex Hurst may refer to:
 Alex Hurst (rugby), rugby league & rugby union footballer
 Alex Hurst (footballer), English footballer
 Alexandra Hurst, footballer from Northern Ireland